Lincolnshire Co-op is an independent consumer co-operative which operates in Lincolnshire, and the surrounding counties. The society has over 220 outlets with its principal trading activity being its food stores, funeral homes, florist and crematorium, travel agencies, post offices and pharmacies. The Society is owned by over 295,000 members who hold Lincolnshire Co-op dividend cards, equal to approximately one quarter of the population of Greater Lincolnshire. The society also owns Gadsby's bakery which is based in Southwell, Nottinghamshire.

As a co-operative, it shares all its profits with members. Ways of doing this include paying dividend and a dividend bonus at the end of the year, investing in new and improved services and supporting community groups and charities. 
Since Lincolnshire County Council closed a number of libraries across the county, Lincolnshire Co-op has operated three libraries as part of its commitment to supporting communities.

In the last full year of trading, 2021/22, Lincolnshire Co-op recorded sales of £399m and a trading surplus of £16.6m. Society membership was 296,077.

About
Community Champions
In 2013, the Society set up the Community Champions scheme which sees every member linked to a good cause near to where they live. Every time they shop with the Society, a donation goes to that good cause. In its first year, the scheme had already given away £192,750 to local causes.
Community Champions change every three months and reflect a different area of the community every quarter.
Donations have included over £221,275,000 for local school breakfast clubs, £150,381 for local life-saving resources and charities and £134,722 for Breast Cancer Now.

Investors in People
Lincolnshire Co-op achieved Investors in People Platinum Investors In People – a prestigious title shared by only two per cent of IIP employers.

To help staff develop, employees can undertake a Foundation Degree in Business Management. The two year qualification was designed specifically for Lincolnshire Co-op by the University of Lincoln and is delivered by trainers from the Society and academics from the University.

History

Lincolnshire Co-operative was founded as Lincoln Co-operative Society in 1861, inspired by Gainsborough joiner Thomas Parker.

Trading began at 1 Napoleon Place, Lincoln, in September 1861. By the end of the first quarter, there were 74 members and the dividend was 9d. Now there are around 296,000 members.

When the Society reached its 150th birthday in 2011, it celebrated with a year of special events including a ‘Big Birthday Bash’ playing host to Lulu and indie rock band Scouting For Girls. It renovated a 1970s ‘birthday bus’ and an exhibition was held at The Museum of Lincolnshire Life, showcasing the Society’s eventful history and a memory book, where members had shared comments about their Co-op from over the years. Over half a million pounds was also donated to local good causes through the ‘Big Birthday Awards’.

Trading
The Society operates food stores. All of the stores sell a range of locally sourced produce called ‘Love Local’ which is made up of items from the local area. Products include Lincolnshire Poacher cheese made in Alford and Pipers Crisps made in Brigg.

The Love Local range also includes a selection of baked goods including bread, cakes and Lincolnshire treats like plum bread made by the Society’s own bakery called Gadsby’s based near Newark.

The Society runs pharmacies that dispense and deliver prescriptions. All of the outlets have consultation rooms where people can have private advice from pharmacists and trained advisors. They offer a range of services including sexual health checks and blood pressure tests.

Several of its pharmacies are being refitted as ‘healthy living’ hubs to include better facilities and emphasis on providing clinical services and giving information and advice on health matters. The concept not only encourages healthy lifestyles and the prevention of health problems but also aims to reduce expensive waste and relieve some of the burden on GP practices.

Funeral services are another part of Lincolnshire Co-op’s family of businesses. It has provided the service for over 125 years. It offers a complete funeral arrangement service, funeral plans, and links clients to a bereavement counselling service.

The Society has travel branches which provide a wide range of services from holiday bookings to insurance, car hire, currency, luggage and more. Many branches also offer specialist extras like cruise, wedding and ski experts.

Lincolnshire Co-op also runs post offices, filling stations, coffee shops, a memorial mason and a florist.

In November 2013, Lincolnshire Co-op opened South Lincolnshire Crematorium, a community facility available for ceremonies organised by all local funeral directors. It includes a memorial garden, a flower court and a chapel that seats 100 people.

Subsidiaries
The following trading companies are wholly owned subsidiary undertakings of the parent society:
 Lincoln Co-operative Chemists Ltd.
 LCS Retail Limited
 Lincoln Shop Equipment Ltd.
 LCS Property Limited
 Lincoln Corn Exchange and Markets (1991) Ltd.
 F Maltby & Sons Ltd
 Gadsby’s of Southwell Ltd. 
 Greetwell Developments Ltd. 
 Ellcee Limited

See also
 British co-operative movement
 Lincolnshire Co-operative Challenge
 Lincolnshire Credit Union

References

External links
 Lincolnshire Co-operative
 Lincolnshire Co-operative's historical archive

Companies based in Lincoln, England
British companies established in 1861
Retail companies established in 1861
Consumers' co-operatives of the United Kingdom
Department stores of the United Kingdom
1861 establishments in England
Economy of Lincolnshire
Funeral-related companies of the United Kingdom
Supermarkets of the United Kingdom